The 2023 Grand Prix Zagreb Open, was a wrestling event held in Zagreb, Croatia between 1 and 5 February 2023. It was held as the first of the ranking series of United World Wrestling in 2023. With an aim to reward wrestlers participating in Ranking Series tournaments, the United World Wrestling will award prize money to the medal winners in all weight classes with a total prize money of 390,000 Swiss Francs. The gold medal winners at the four Ranking Series tournaments in 2023 will receive 1500 Swiss Francs with the silver medallists getting 750 Swiss Francs. The two bronze medallists will receive 500 Swiss Francs each.

Ranking Series
Ranking Series Calendar 2023 of United World Wrestling:
 1st Ranking Series: 1-5 February, Croatia, Zagreb ⇒ 2023 Grand Prix Zagreb Open
 2nd Ranking Series: 23-26 February, Egypt, Alexandria ⇒ 2023 Ibrahim Moustafa Tournament
 3rd Ranking Series: 1-4 June, Kyrgyzstan, Bishkek ⇒ 2023 Kaba Uulu Kozhomkul & Raatbek Sanatbaev Tournament
 4th Ranking Series: 13-16 July, Hungary, Budapest ⇒ 2023 Hungarian Grand Prix & Polyák Imre Memorial Tournament

Competition schedule
All times are (UTC+2)

Medal table

Team ranking

Medal overview

Men's freestyle

Men's Greco-Roman

Women's freestyle

Participating nations 
489 wrestlers from 41 countries:

  (3)
  (10)
  (30)
  (2)
  (10)
  (18)
  (39)
  (18) (Host)
  (2)
  (5)
  (3)
  (4)
  (3)
  (2)
  (2)
  (7)
  (22)
  (9)
  (32)
  (19)
  (24)
  (3)
  (15)
  (29)
  (2)
  (1)
  (15)
  (8)
  (7)
  (2)
  (7)
  (30)
  (2)
  (6)
  (1)
  (6)
  (6)
  (3)
  (9)
  (54)
  (19)

Results

Men's freestyle

Men's freestyle 57 kg
 Legend
 F — Won by fall

Men's freestyle 61 kg
 Legend
 F — Won by fall

Men's freestyle 65 kg
 Legend
 F — Won by fall

Men's freestyle 70 kg
 Legend
 F — Won by fall

Men's freestyle 74 kg
 Legend
 F — Won by fall

Men's freestyle 79 kg
 Legend
 F — Won by fall

Men's freestyle 86 kg
 Legend
 F — Won by fall

Men's freestyle 92 kg
 Legend
 F — Won by fall

Men's freestyle 97 kg
 Legend
 F — Won by fall

Men's freestyle 125 kg
 Legend
 F — Won by fall

Men's Greco-Roman

Men's Greco-Roman 55 kg
 Legend
 F — Won by fall
Feb 2023

Men's Greco-Roman 60 kg
 Legend
 R — Retired

Men's Greco-Roman 63 kg

Men's Greco-Roman 67 kg
 Legend
 F — Won by fall
WO — Won by walkover

Top half

Bottom half

Men's Greco-Roman 72 kg
 Legend
 F — Won by fall
WO — Won by walkover
{| class="wikitable" style="text-align: center; font-size:90% "
!colspan=3|Round of 32
|-
! align="right" width="250"|
!width="60"|Score
!align="left" width="250"|
|-
|align=left|
|align=center|1-4
|align=left|
|-
|align=left|
|align=center|0-6
|align=left|
|-
|align=left|
|align=center|5-4
|align=left|
|-
|align=left|
|align=center|4-3
|align=left||-
|align=left||align=center|5-3
|align=left|
|-
|align=left||align=center|WO|align=left|
|-
|align=left||align=center|10-2
|align=left|
|}

Men's Greco-Roman 77 kg
 Legend
 F — Won by fall
 R — Retired
 C — Won by 3 cautions given to the opponent
 WO — Won by walkoverTop halfBottom halfMen's Greco-Roman 82 kg
 Legend
 F — Won by fall

Men's Greco-Roman 87 kg
 Legend
 F — Won by fall
 R — Retired
 WO — Won by walkoverTop halfBottom halfMen's Greco-Roman 97 kg
 Legend
 F — Won by fall
 R — Retired
 WO — Won by walkoverTop halfBottom halfMen's Greco-Roman 130 kg
 Legend
 F — Won by fall

Women's freestyle
Women's freestyle 50 kg
 Legend
 F — Won by fall
 WO — Won by walkover

Women's freestyle 53 kg
 Legend
 F — Won by fall

Women's freestyle 57 kg
 Legend
 F''' — Won by fall

References

External links 
 UWW Official Website
 Results Book

2023 in sport wrestling
International wrestling competitions hosted by Croatia
Sports competitions in Zagreb
Wrestling in Croatia
2023 in Croatian sport
Grand Prix Zagreb Open